Kim Owens (born July 23, 1969), better known by his stage name Kem, is an American R&B/Soul singer–songwriter and producer. Born in Nashville, Tennessee, Kem was raised in Pontiac, Michigan.

Career
Kem wrote, produced, and financed his self-released debut album, Kemistry, with his American Express card and by singing top 40 cover tunes in a wedding band and waiting tables. He was signed by Motown Records in November 2001, which re-released the album on February 25, 2003. It sold more than 500,000 copies nationwide and was certified Gold by the RIAA. The album's only official single is "Love Calls".

His second album, Album II, was released on May 17, 2005, and was certified Platinum by the RIAA.  It includes the single "I Can't Stop Loving You", a #1 song at urban adult contemporary radio, and the song "You Might Win" featuring Stevie Wonder on harmonica. His third album, Intimacy: Album III, was released on August 17, 2010, and was certified Gold by the RIAA.

In 2013, Kem was featured on "My Favorite Thing", with American recording artist Ronald Isley who Kem wrote and produced for. The song is the second single from Isley's album This Song Is For You.

On August 25, 2014, Kem released his fourth studio album, Promise to Love. He performed the Grammy-nominated song "Nobody" from the album on the syndicated daytime talk show Steve Harvey during the fourth season. On August 28, 2020, he released his fifth studio album, Love Always Wins, which includes the singles "Lie To Me" and "Live Out Your Love" featuring Toni Braxton.

Discography

Studio albums
{|class="wikitable plainrowheaders" style="text-align:center;" border="1"
! scope="col" rowspan="2" style="width:15em;"| Title
! scope="col" rowspan="2" style="width:16em;"| Album details
! scope="col" colspan="2"| Peak positions
! scope="col" rowspan="2" style="width:14em;"| Certifications
|-
! width="40" align="center" |US
! width=40 align=center|US R&B
|-
! scope="row"|Kemistry|
Released: February 25, 2003
Label: Motown
Format: CD, digital download
|align=center|90
|align=center|14
|align=center|
 RIAA: Gold
|-
! scope="row"|Album II
|
Released: May 17, 2005
Label: Motown
Format: CD, digital download
|align=center|5
|align=center|1
|align=center|
RIAA: Platinum
|-
! scope="row"|Intimacy: Album III
|
Released: August 17, 2010
Label: Universal Motown
Format: CD, digital download
|align=center|2
|align=center|2
|align=center|
RIAA: Gold
|-
! scope="row"|What Christmas Means
|
Released: October 16, 2012 
Label: Kemistry, Motown
Format: CD, digital download
|align=center|64
|align=center|9
|align=center|
|-
! scope="row"|Promise to Love
|
Released: August 25, 2014
Label: Kemistry, Motown
Format: CD, digital download
|align=center|3
|align=center|1
|align=center|
|-
! scope="row"|Love Always Wins
|
Released: August 28, 2020
Label: Motown
Format: CD, digital download
|align=center| 124
|align=center| 15
|align=center| 
|}

Extended plays

Singles

Awards and nominations
2005: Billboard Music Award win''' for Top Adult R&B Single of the Year, "I Can't Stop Loving You"
2005: Billboard Music Award nomination for Top Adult R&B Artist of the Year (lost to Fantasia).
2011: 53rd Grammy Awards, Best R&B Male Performance, “Why Would You Stay” (Nomination)
2011: 53rd Grammy Awards, Best R&B Song, "Why Would You Stay" (Nomination)
2014: 57th Grammy Awards, Best Traditional R&B Performance, "Nobody" (Nomination)

References

External links
MusicByKEM.com – Official website
KEM on Facebook
KEM on Twitter

Living people
American neo soul singers
Motown artists
1969 births
Singers from Detroit
Ballad musicians
Universal Motown Records artists
21st-century African-American male singers